II Lupi (IRAS 15194-5115) is a Mira variable and carbon star located in the constellation Lupus. It is the brightest carbon star in the Southern Hemisphere at 12 μm.

In 1987, the infrared source IRAS 15194-5115 was identified as an extreme carbon star. It was seen to be strongly variable at optical and infrared wavelengths. It is very faint visually, 15th or 16th magnitude in a red filter and below 21st magnitude in a blue filter, but at mid-infrared wavelengths (N band) it is the third-brightest carbon star in the sky. A star at the location had earlier been catalogued as WOS 48, a possible S-type star, on the basis of strong LaO bands in its spectrum.

On the basis of infrared photometry, IRAS 15194-5115 was given the variable star designation II Lupi in 1995, although the variability type was still unknown. More detailed infrared photometry confirmed that II Lupi was a Mira variable and showed regular variations with a period of 575 days over 18 years. The mean magnitude also dimmed and brightened during that time and has been characterised as a 6,900-day secondary period although less than a full cycle was observed. The secondary period could be interpreted as an isolated or irregular obscuration event in a dust shell surrounding the star.

References 

Mira variables
Carbon stars
Lupus (constellation)
Lupi, II
IRAS catalogue objects
J15230507-5125587